Megalophaedusa spelaeonis, in Japanese: , is a species of small, air-breathing land snail, terrestrial pulmonate gastropod mollusk in the family Clausiliidae, the door snails, all of which have a clausilium.

Description 
The height of the shell is 10–11 mm. The width of the shell is 2.5–3 mm.

Distribution 
This species is endemic to central part of Kumamoto Prefecture, Kyushu, Japan.

It is endangered species (CR+EN) in Japan.

Ecology 
It lives in limestone caves.

References

 Kuroda, T. & Minato, H. (1975). Description of a New Genus and Two New Species of Clausiliidae from Lime-stone Caves in Japan. Venus (Japanese Journal of Malacology). 34(1-2): 1-10.

Further reading 
  浜田 善利 (1967). "錘乳洞内のキセルガイ : イシカワギセルとカザアナギセル:". ちりぼたん 4(8): 133-136. CiNii.
  黒田徳米 & 湊 宏 (1975). "石灰岩洞窟産キセルガイの１新属２新種". Venus 34'(1-2): 1-3. Malacological Society of Japan, Tokyo.

External links 
 http://shell.kwansei.ac.jp/~shell/pic_book/data48/r004707.html
  http://www.biodic.go.jp/rdb_fts/before/506.html

Clausiliidae
Molluscs of Japan
Gastropods described in 1975
Taxonomy articles created by Polbot